Tolamolol is a beta adrenergic receptor antagonist.

References

Beta blockers
Abandoned drugs